Epsilon Piscis Austrini, Latinized from ε Piscis Austrini, is a blue-white hued star in the southern constellation of Piscis Austrinus. It is visible to the naked eye with an apparent visual magnitude of +4.17. Based upon an annual parallax shift of 8.0981 ± 0.3582 mas as seen from the GAIA satellite, the system is located roughly 400 light years from the Sun.

This is a B-type main sequence star with a stellar classification of B8 Ve. It is a Be star that is spinning rapidly with a projected rotational velocity of 216 km/s, compared to an equatorial critical velocity of 301 km/s. The star has 4.1 times the mass of the Sun and is radiating 661 times the solar luminosity from its photosphere at an effective temperature of 11,066 K.

Epsilon Piscis Austrini is moving through the Galaxy at a speed of 18.7 km/s relative to the Sun.

Naming

 ε Piscis Austrini
 29 Aquarii
 35 Aquarii
 41 Aquarii
 47 Aquarii
 49 Aquarii
 λ Piscis Austrini
 HD 212448
 21 Piscis Austrini
 20 Piscis Austrini
 υ Aquarii
 68 Aquarii
 66 Aquarii
 61 Aquarii
 53 Aquarii
 50 Aquarii
 56 Aquarii
 45 Aquarii
 58 Aquarii
 64 Aquarii
 65 Aquarii
 70 Aquarii
 74 Aquarii
 τ2 Aquarii
 τ1 Aquarii
 δ Aquarii
 77 Aquarii
 88 Aquarii
 89 Aquarii
 86 Aquarii
 101 Aquarii
 100 Aquarii
 99 Aquarii
 98 Aquarii
 97 Aquarii
 94 Aquarii
 ψ3Aquarii
 ψ2Aquarii
 ψ1Aquarii
 87 Aquarii
 85 Aquarii
 83 Aquarii
 χ Aquarii
 ω1 Aquarii
 ω2 Aquarii

References

B-type main-sequence stars
Be stars

Piscis Austrinus
Piscis Austrini, Epsilon
Durchmusterung objects
Piscis Austrini, 18
214748
111954
8628